Harlem is a city in Blaine County, Montana, United States. The population was 769 at the 2020 census.

The Fort Belknap Indian Reservation is just south of the town, across the Milk River. 

Like other towns along the Hi-Line, Great Northern Railway officials chose the name of a European city for this new town. In this case it was Haarlem, in the Netherlands. A. A. Cecil platted the townsite in 1889.

Geography
Harlem is located at  (48.531752, -108.784407). It is located along U.S. Route 2.

Demographics

2010 census
As of the census of 2010, there were 808 people, 307 households, and 204 families residing in the city. The racial makeup of the city was 42.1% White, 52.2% Native American, 0.1% Pacific Islander, 0.1% from other races, and 5.4% from two or more races. Hispanic or Latino of any race were 4.0% of the population.

There were 307 households, of which 36.2% had children under the age of 18 living with them, 44.6% were married couples living together, 15.6% had a female householder with no husband present, 6.2% had a male householder with no wife present, and 33.6% were non-families. 29.6% of all households were made up of individuals, and 14.7% had someone living alone who was 65 years of age or older. The average household size was 2.49 and the average family size was 3.08.

The median age in the city was 36.6 years. 28.6% of residents were under the age of 18; 8.5% were between the ages of 18 and 24; 22.4% were from 25 to 44; 23.7% were from 45 to 64; and 17% were 65 years of age or older. The gender makeup of the city was 45.3% male and 54.7% female.

2000 census
As of the census of 2000, there were 848 people, 332 households, and 232 families residing in the city. The population density was 1,976.7 people per square mile (761.4/km2). There were 401 housing units at an average density of 934.7 per square mile (360.1/km2). The racial makeup of the city was 52.59% White, 0.24% African American, 42.57% Native American, 0.24% Asian, 0.12% from other races, and 4.25% from two or more races. Hispanic or Latino of any race were 1.65% of the population.

There were 332 households, out of which 33.4% had children under the age of 18 living with them, 51.2% were married couples living together, 15.1% had a female householder with no husband present, and 30.1% were non-families. 29.5% of all households were made up of individuals, and 11.7% had someone living alone who was 65 years of age or older. The average household size was 2.50 and the average family size was 3.09.

In the city, the population was spread out, with 29.4% under the age of 18, 7.9% from 18 to 24, 22.4% from 25 to 44, 23.7% from 45 to 64, and 16.6% who were 65 years of age or older. The median age was 37 years. For every 100 females there were 89.7 males. For every 100 females age 18 and over, there were 93.2 males.

The median income for a household in the city was $27,794, and the median income for a family was $33,828. Males had a median income of $24,145 versus $21,750 for females. The per capita income for the city was $13,295. About 16.5% of families and 23.0% of the population were below the poverty line, including 32.8% of those under age 18 and 8.5% of those age 65 or over.

Infrastructure
Harlem Airport is a public use airport located three miles (6 km) north of town.

Education
Harlem is home to Harlem Elementary and Harlem Jr./Sr. High. They are known as the Wildcats.

Aaniiih Nakoda College is a two year institution in the town.

Harlem Public Library serves the area.

Notable people
 Francis Bardanouve, politician
 Ken Hansen, state senator
 Frank Warnke, politician

See also
 List of municipalities in Montana

References

External links

Cities in Blaine County, Montana
Cities in Montana